2001 Czech Lion Awards ceremony was held on 2 March 2002. Jan Švankmajer's Little Otik has won the Best film award.

Winners and nominees

Non-statutory Awards

References

2001 film awards
Czech Lion Awards ceremonies